IBTE Sultan Saiful Rijal Campus, formerly known as Sultan Saiful Rijal Technical College (Malay,), is one of the technical institute in Bandar Seri Begawan, Brunei. Since 2014, it has been subsumed and fully administered under the Institute of Brunei Technical Education.

Schools and programmes offered
Sultan Saiful Rijal Campus is home to three Schools, offering Higher National Technical Certificate (HNTec) and National Technical Certificate (NTec) programmes are:

 School of Hospitality and Tourism
 HNTec in Hospitality Operations
 HNTec in Travel and Tourism
 NTec in Culinary Operations
 NTec Apprenticeship in Professional Cookery And Services

 School of Information and Communication Technology, Branch
 HNTec in Information Technology
 HNTec in Information and Library Studies
 NTec in Information Technology

 School of Aviation (New building off Serusop roundabout)
 HNTec in Aircraft Maintenance Engineering (Avionics)
 HNTec in Aircraft Maintenance Engineering (Airframe and Engine)
 HNTec in Electronic Engineering
 HNTec in Electronics and Media Technology
 HNTec in Telecommunication Systems

References

External links
Institute of Brunei Technical Education's website

Sultan Saiful Rijal Campus
Educational institutions established in 1970
1970 establishments in Brunei